Springside railway station was a railway station serving the village of Springside, North Ayrshire, Scotland. The station was originally part of the Glasgow, Paisley, Kilmarnock and Ayr Railway.

History
The station opened in 1890, and closed permanently to passengers on 6 April 1964. Also known as Springside Halt, this station had no freight facilities. The line between Irvine and Crosshouse continued to be used by trains until October 1965. The last passenger train through the station was a Kilmaurs Sunday Schools special train to Ardrossan (South Beach) on Saturday, 20 June 1964.

Originally Springside had a siding and a signal box, operated by a signalman who came down from Crosshouse on the shunt; once the day's work had been completed the signalman would catch the next available train back to Crosshouse. Springside was linked to Springhill collieries numbers 1, 2, 3, and 4, as well as Cauldhame colliery. All these single track lines linked to the siding and were worked by the usual 'Pug' engines. Latterly the station was an unstaffed halt.

About 300 yards from the station was another siding known locally as 'The Hurries', serving Springside Number 10 colliery. A horse-operated line, 'The Bogie Line', ran up from the pit, conveying the hutches to be unloaded into trucks waiting at the siding.

Views of the station

References

Notes

Sources
 
 Fowler, Richard. The Busby Branch. G&SWR Society
 
 

Disused railway stations in North Ayrshire
Railway stations in Great Britain opened in 1890
Railway stations in Great Britain closed in 1964
Beeching closures in Scotland
Former Glasgow and South Western Railway stations